Franciszek Ksawery Lubomirski (1747–1819) was a Polish noble, Russian general.
Son of Stanisław Lubomirski, he had many possessions around Kiev, which following the First Partition of Poland fell under the Russian Empire control. Franciszek Ksawery decided to become a Russian citizen. In 1777 he joined the Russian Army, eventually reaching the rank of general major.

Married three times, he had several children.

1747 births
1829 deaths
Polish generals in the Imperial Russian Army
Ksawery
18th-century Polish–Lithuanian landowners
19th-century Polish landowners